This is a list of schools in Huairou District, Beijing.

Secondary schools
Note: In China the word 中学 zhōngxué, literally translated as "middle school", refers to any secondary school and differs from the American usage of the term "middle school" to mean specifically a lower secondary school or junior high school. 初中 chū​zhōng is used to refer to a lower secondary school.

 Beijing 101 Middle School Huairou Branch School (怀柔分校)
 Beijing City Huairou District Beihuai (Norh Huairou) School (北京市怀柔区怀北学校)
 Beijing City Huairou District Miaocheng School (北京市怀柔区庙城学校)
 Beijing City Huairou District Yanqi School (北京市怀柔区雁栖学校)
 Beijing City Huairou District No. 1 High School (北京市怀柔区第一中学)
 Beijing City Huairou District No. 2 High School (北京市怀柔区第二中学)
 Beijing City Huairou District No. 3 High School (北京市怀柔区第三中学)
 Beijing City Huairou District No. 4 High School (北京市怀柔区第四中学)
 Beijing City Huairou District No. 5 High School (北京市怀柔区第五中学)
 Beijing City Huairou District Baoshan High School (北京市怀柔区宝山中学)
 Beijing City Huairou District Beifang High School (北京市怀柔区北房中学)
 Beijing City Huairou District Bohai High School (北京市怀柔区渤海中学)
 Beijing City Huairou District Chuzhang Xiao Ying Manchu High School (北京市怀柔区长哨营满族中学)
 Beijing City Huairou District Jiuduhe High School (北京市怀柔区九渡河中学)
 Beijing City Huairou District Labagoumen Manchu High School (北京市怀柔区喇叭沟门满族中学)
 Beijing City Huairou District Qiaozi High School (北京市怀柔区桥梓中学)
 Beijing City Huairou District Shanghekou High School (北京市怀柔区汤河口中学)
 Beijing City Huairou District Yangsong High School (北京市怀柔区杨宋中学)
 Beijing City Huairou District Zhanggechang High School (北京市怀柔区张各长中学)
 Beijing City Huairou District Physical Education School (北京市怀柔区体育运动学校)
 Capital Normal University Affiliated Hongluo Temple High School (首都师范大学附属红螺寺中学)

Primary schools

 Beijing City Huairou District Chawu Railway Primary School (北京市怀柔区茶坞铁路小学)

References

Huairou
Schools